Albert Goodwin (1887–1918) was a Canadian trade unionist.

Albert Goodwin may also refer to:

Albert Goodwin (historian) (1906–1995), English historian
Albert Goodwin (artist) (1845–1932), English landscape painter

See also
Goodwin (surname)